"Neeye Oli" is the 2021 Tamil song composed by Santhosh Narayanan and Shan Vincent de Paul, who also recorded the track along with Navz-47; with lyrics for the track being written by Arivu and Shan Vincent de Paul. It is the second release from the upcoming studio album Made in Jaffna curated by Shan which was under production for four years. It released on 30 June 2021 by the music label/management Maajja, an independent platform launched by A. R. Rahman. The song is used as the theme track for Pa. Ranjith-directorial Sarpatta Parambarai.

Premise 
The song was picturised on the character Kabilan (Arya), who had its share of ups-and-downs in his life, and eventually try to bounce back with all his might. While writing the song, Shan had found it "easy to connect with the song because it was reflective of his journey" and considered it as him channeling the inner Muhammad Ali.

Production 
The song was one of the two singles being released from Made in Jaffna, curated by Shan Vincent de Paul for four years. The album song also featured composer Santhosh Narayanan who also worked on the track, along with Navz-47, whom Shan collaborated in the 2019 single "Heaven" which is also released on the same album. It also marked Santhosh's second release through the platform Maajja after the viral song "Enjoy Enjaami".

The song was pitched during Shan's tour to Chennai in 2019, where he eventually met composer Santhosh Narayanan. During the conversation, Santhosh sent the initial minutes of the song and told the idea and theme of this song, which Shan had liked it. The song marked their major collaboration for the album as Shan credited Santhosh that "he was the first major producer in India to bring him (Shan) into the Tamil music scene". The song was synced to the Pa. Ranjith-directorial Sarpatta Parambarai, being one of the two songs from the film.

Music video 

The music video for the single is directed by Shan Vincent de Paul and Kalainithan Kalaichelvan. He added that "I wanted the aesthetic of this video to represent me and my collaborators, and fashion was that catalyst. This is Toronto meets Tamil Eelam. It's a place where couture meets the ancient past, avant-garde intersects with traditional gowns[...] it's the meeting point of all these different identities". The video song was filmed at Studio MOCA, in order to create a "fantastical sci-fi world driven by fashion". As of September 2021, the promotional video song of "Neeye Oli" featured about 2.8 million views in YouTube.

The music video was nominated for the 2022 Juno Award for "Video of the Year".

Film version 
For the film Sarpatta Parambarai, Santhosh composed a different set of strophe without the rap versions crooned by Shan Vincent (in English) and Navz-47, but featured vocals by Santhosh himself, with Arivu writing the lyrics. However, the original version was also featured in the end credits of the film.

Track listing 

 "Neeye Oli" (Original) by Shan Vincent de Paul, Navz-47 and Santhosh Narayanan – 3:57
 "Neeye Oli" (Film Version) by Santhosh Narayanan – 4:28

Rolling Stone cover issue 
On 20 August 2021, the magazine Rolling Stone India published a cover edition for the month July 2021, featuring the singer Shan Vincent de Paul and Dhee, who gained immense popularity after the song "Enjoy Enjaami". However, Arivu, the co-contributor of these songs were not featured in the edition. This gained the attention from Pa. Ranjith, who went on criticise the executives of the magazine and music platform Maajja, for failing to credit the lyricist and interviewing him. Netizens pointed Arivu's erasure as a significant example of caste-based discrimination as he belonged to the marginalised Dalit community.

Shan Vincent also came in support for Arivu, calling out Maajja for his removal, but also criticised Pa. Ranjith for creating a rift between the artists. He released the rap song titled "Take Cover" which had verses criticising the director, for not including his version in the film Sarpatta Parambarai, and had denied composer Santhosh Narayanan's requests on his inclusion in the album. Following the controversy, Rolling Stone India published another edition in August 2021, featuring Arivu and other artists, that following week.

Noel Kirthiraj, CEO of Maajja, released a statement in response to the issue regarding Arivu's erasure, saying:

Personnel 
Credits adapted from Maajja

 Shan Vincent de Paul – Vocalist, composer, album producer, lyricist
 Santhosh Narayanan – Composer, album producer, playback singer, sound engineer (Future Tense Studios, Chennai)
 Navz-47 – Playback singer
 Arivu – Lyricist
 Joseph Vijay – Guitar
 RK Sundar – Sound engineer (Future Tense Studios, Chennai), percussions, drums
 Sai Shravanam – Sound engineer (Resound India, Chennai), audio mixing, mastering
Pranav Muniraj – Additional programming, music supervision
 Meenakshi Santhosh – Music co-ordinator

References

External links 

 
 Neeye Oli on Spotify

2021 songs
Indian songs
Tamil-language songs
Songs written for films
Songs with lyrics by Arivu